Thomas McLauchlan (1815–1886) was a Scottish minister and theological author who served as Moderator of the General Assembly for the Free Church of Scotland 1876/77.

He was one of the first to promote Gaelic as an academic language. In 1859, he fuelled the fire of the Ossian debate by producing the "Gaelic originals" of the poem.

Life

This popular Gaelic divine was born at Moy, Inverness-shire, on the 29 January 1816. His father was the James Maclauchlan, who laboured long in Moy, while his mother was a member of the Clan Fraser. He was the youngest son of James McLauchlan of Moy in Invernessshire, a Church of Scotland minister. His grandfather was Lauchlan McLauchlan of Abriachan. He studied at King's College, Aberdeen, Marischal College, Aberdeen graduating in 1833 and then the Theological College in Edinburgh under Thomas Chalmers. He was licensed to preach in 1837 by the Presbytery of Inverness, and was appointed colleague and successor to his father at Moy in 1838. At the Disruption he threw in his lot with the protesting party and was appointed minister of Stratherrick. He served the Free Church throughout the Highlands, and in 1846 he went to Canada to visit the Presbyterian Church there as the representative of the Free Church of Scotland. In the spring of 1849 he was called to St. Columba Gaelic Free Church, Edinburgh, where he laboured till the close of his career. He was then living at 16 Keir Street near the Edinburgh Royal Infirmary. He undertook the charge of a Gaelic class for the benefit of Highland students attending the Edinburgh University which he conducted for many years. In 1856 he was made a member of the Society of Antiquaries of Scotland, and among the papers which he contributed to that Society's transactions were — "On the Dean of Lismore's Gaelic Manuscript " ; " On Standing Stones in the Ross of Mull " ; "On the Kymric Element in the Topography of Scotland. 1 ' In 1864 he received the honour of LL.D. from Aberdeen University. He acted as convener of the Free Church Committee on the Highlands and Islands from 1854 till 1882, and was a warm supporter of whatever had for its object the moral and material welfare of his Highland fellow-countrymen. In 1876 he succeeded Rev Alexander Moody Stuart as Moderator of the General Assembly of the Free Church. He was then living at Viewforth Manse and preaching at Viewforth Church. He died at Edinburgh 21st March, 1886.

Among his best known works are "The Early Scottish Church," 1873; "Carsweirs Prayer Book," 1873; Celtic Gleanings," 1857: "The Dean of Lismore's Book," 1862; "The Gaelic Reference Bible;" which he edited along with Dr. Clark, Kilmallie; "The Review of Gaelic Literature" (1877), which appeared in the "History of the Highlands and Highland Clans," was also from his pen. For many years he translated the "Monthly Visitor" into Gaelic, and the " Fear-tathaich Miosail" was heartily welcomed in many a Highland clachan. Dr. Skene who wrote the "Introduction " to the Dean of Lismore's book, makes the following reference to the labours of Dr. Maclauchlan in connection with that publication: — "It is hardly possible to convey to the reader an adequate conception of the labour of the task undertaken by Dr. Maclauchlan, or of the courage, perseverance and ability with which it has been overcome. Dr. Maclauchlan had first to read the Dean's transcript — no ordinary task, when to a strange orthography, affording no clue to the original word, was added a careless handwriting of the beginning of the sixteenth century, faded ink, and decayed paper. He had then to convert it into the corresponding Gaelic in its modern shape and orthography, and then to translate it into English, in which he had to combine the literal rendering of an idiomatic language with an intelligible exhibition of its meaning in English."

In addition to the original works written by Dr. Maclauchlan, he edited a pocket edition of " Ossian's Poems " and an edition of " Stewart's Gaelic Grammar," while his contributions to current Gaelic literature will be found in the pages of "The Gael" and "Bratach na Firinn".

He died on 21 March 1886. He is buried in Grange Cemetery in south Edinburgh. The grave lies near the centre of the north-west section.

Publications
"United  Parishes  of  Moy  and Dalarossie"   (Presbyterial   and    Parochial Reports    on    the    State    of   Education in Scotland  (1843),  150-5)
The  Depopulation System  in  the  Highlands  (1849)
The   Way to  God,  or  the  Doctrine  of  Christ's  Mediatorship  briefly  Expounded  (Edinburgh,  1853)
Celtic  Gleanings :  or  Notices  of  the  History and  Literature  of  the  Scottish  Gael  (Edinburgh,  1857)
The  Poems   of  Ossian  [in Gaelic]    (1859)
The    Dean    of  Lismore's Book  [translated  and  edited  with  William Forbes  Skene,  LL.D.]  (Edinburgh,  1862)
The  Early  Scottish  Church  from  the  First to  the  Twelfth  Century  (Edinburgh,  1865)
"Gaelic  Literature,  Language,  and  Music" (in  John  Scott  Keltie's  A  History  of  the Scottish     Highlands    (Edinburgh,     1882)
"Notice  of   Monoliths   on  the   Island  of Mull"    (Proc.    Soc.   Antiq.   Scot.,  v.,   48)
"On  the  Kymric  Element  in  the   Celtic Topography  of  Scotland"  (Ibid.,  vi.,  315)
Recent     Highland     Ejections     considered (Edinburgh,    1850)
Criosd    an    t-eadar mheadhonair  'na  Righ,  Sermon  in  Gaelic (Edinburgh,  1860)
The  Book  of  Common Order,     commonly    called    John     Knox's Liturgy,    translated     into    Gaelic   (1567) by  John    Carswell,  Bishop   of    the    Isles [the    first    book    printed    in    Gaelic,    of which    only    three    imperfect    copies    are known]    (Edinburgh,    1873)
The    Gaelic Reference   Bible  [jointly  with  Dr   Clerk, Kilmallie]  (Glasgow,  1860,  1863,  and  other editions

Artistic recognition

He was portrayed by Norman Macbeth

Family
He was married three times:
(1)   22 March  1848,  Eliza  (died    16  January  1855, aged  30),  daughter  of  George  Mackay,  D.D., Free    Church, Rafford,    and    had    issue —
James  John,  actuary,  secretary  Equitable Insurance  Co.,  born  13  December  1848,  died at  Bath,  26  December  1920
George  Mackay, planter,  India,  born  6  April  1851
Hugh Simon,  journalist,  born   13    December   1852, died  December   1899
Eliza    Helen,  born  8 January  1855,  died  21  January   1885
(2)  30 July  1857,   Margaret  Hunter    (died    25 January  1864),  daughter  of  John  Geddes,  C.E., and  Davida Sutherland,  and  had  issue —
John  David,  mining  engineer,  born  14 September  1859
Thomas    George,    physician, born   16    July    1861,  died    September    1898
Margaret  Hunter  Geddes,  born  25  January 1864
(3) 25  February  1869,  Fanny  L.  (died 13  April  1922),  daughter  of  Hugh  Fraser, Aberskey,  Stratherrick,  and    had issue — 
Francis,    born    4    January   1870,  died  29 March      1878
Simon    Lachlan    Fraser, electrical  engineer,  born   14  July  1872
Catherine    Anna,   born  20   September    1874

His older brother Simon Fraser McLauchlan (1808-1881) was also a Free Church minister.

References

Citations

Sources

1815 births
1886 deaths
Alumni of the University of Aberdeen
19th-century Ministers of the Free Church of Scotland